The Tupolev '102' and Tupolev '101' were 1950s projects for a turboprop airliner and assault transport by the Tupolev Design Bureau. The aircraft designs were almost identical but the '101' had a rear loading ramp and tail barbette for two Nudelman-Rikhter NR-23 cannon. The internal arrangement also differed with the '101' cabin being unpressurised apart from the flightdeck and a small cabin for ten passengers, whilst the '102's pressurised cabin was in one section, configured for 40 passengers. 

Similar requirements were also issued to OKB-23 (V.M. Myasischchev) and OKB-473 (Oleg K. Antonov), resulting in the Antonov An-8 which formed the design root of all Antonov's turboprop transports up to the An-22.

Specifications ('102' projected)

References

1950s Soviet airliners
Low-wing aircraft
Twin-turboprop tractor aircraft